This Is New is an album by pianist Kenny Drew recorded in 1957 and released on the Riverside label.

Reception
The AllMusic review, written by Scott Yanow, gives the album four stars, and states "this session should appeal to straight-ahead bop collectors".

Track listing
 "This Is New" (Kurt Weill, Ira Gershwin)6:56   
 "Carol" (Kenny Drew)4:32   
 "It's You or No One" (Jule Styne, Sammy Cahn)8:08   
 "You're My Thrill" (Jay Gorney, Sidney Clare)5:21   
 "Little T" (Donald Byrd)6:08   
 "Paul's Pal" (Sonny Rollins)6:38   
 "Why Do I Love You?" (Jerome Kern, Oscar Hammerstein II)5:12

Personnel
Kenny Drewpiano
Donald Byrdtrumpet
Hank Mobleytenor saxophone (tracks 1–3) 
Wilbur Warebass
G.T. Hogandrums

References

Kenny Drew albums
1957 albums
Riverside Records albums
Albums produced by Orrin Keepnews